Jean Margraff (17 February 1876 – 11 February 1959) was a French fencer. He won a silver medal in the team sabre event at the 1920 Summer Olympics.

References

External links
 

1876 births
1959 deaths
French male sabre fencers
Olympic fencers of France
Fencers at the 1920 Summer Olympics
Olympic silver medalists for France
Olympic medalists in fencing
Sportspeople from Cher (department)
Medalists at the 1920 Summer Olympics
20th-century French people